Riccardo Sottil (born 3 June 1999) is an Italian professional footballer who plays as a winger for Fiorentina.

Club career

Fiorentina
Sottil joined Fiorentina youth teams in January 2016. He was first called up to Fiorentina's senior squad late in the 2017–18 season.

He made his Serie A debut for Fiorentina on 19 September 2018 in a game against Sampdoria as an 82nd-minute substitute for Federico Chiesa.

Pescara (loan)
On 27 January 2019, Sottil joined to Serie B side Pescara on loan until 30 June 2019.

Cagliari (loan)
On 10 September 2020, Sottil joined to Serie A side Cagliari on loan until 30 June 2021 with an option to buy.

International career
Sottil was first called up to represent his country in August 2016, for Italy national under-18 football team friendlies.

In October 2017, he made one appearance in the 2018 UEFA European Under-19 Championship qualification. He was not selected for the final tournament.

In 2018, he was included in the Italy U20 squad hat played at the 2018–19 Under 20 Elite League.

He made his debut with the Italy U21 on 6 September 2019, in a friendly match won 4–0 against Moldova.

Personal life
His father Andrea Sottil is a football coach and a former player who played 14 seasons in the Serie A.

In October 2020 he tested positive for COVID-19.

Career statistics

References

External links

 Profile at the ACF Fiorentina website 
 

Living people
1999 births
Footballers from Bergamo
Italian footballers
Association football forwards
Italy under-21 international footballers
Italy youth international footballers
ACF Fiorentina players
Delfino Pescara 1936 players
Cagliari Calcio players
Serie A players
Serie B players